Aleksei Arkadyevich Popov (born 8 July 1990) is a former Russian professional football player.

Club career
He made his Russian Premier League debut for FC Krylia Sovetov Samara on 13 March 2010 in a game against FC Zenit St. Petersburg.

External links

References

1990 births
Living people
Russian footballers
Russian Premier League players
PFC Krylia Sovetov Samara players
Association football forwards
FC Spartak Kostroma players